Distorting at the Resort is a 1932 German comedy film directed by Victor Janson and starring Maria Matray, Paul Hörbiger, and Otto Wallburg. It was shot at the Tempelhof Studios in Berlin. The film's sets were designed by the art director Jacek Rotmil.

Synopsis
A young woman wins a stay in a seaside holiday resort by winning a contest. However, once she arrives it is wrongly believed that she is an American millionaires.

Cast

References

Bibliography 
 Klaus, Ulrich J. Deutsche Tonfilme: Jahrgang 1932. Klaus-Archiv, 1988.

External links

1932 comedy films
Films of the Weimar Republic
German comedy films
Films directed by Victor Janson
Films set on islands
Films set in the Baltic Sea
German black-and-white films
1930s German films
Films shot at Tempelhof Studios
1930s German-language films